Isocossus retak is a moth in the family Cossidae. It is found on Borneo. The habitat consists of upper montane forests.

The wingspan is about 22 mm.

References

Natural History Museum Lepidoptera generic names catalog

Cossinae
Moths described in 1986
Moths of Asia